

Set list

Band
Clifford Carter – Piano, Keyboards
Bob Mann – Guitars
Jimmy Johnson – Bass 
Russ Kunkel – Drums 
Luis Conte – Percussion
Arnold McCuller – Vocals 
David Lasley – Vocals 
Kate Markowitz – Vocals 
Valerie Carter – Vocals 
Lou Marini – Saxophones, Flute
Walt Fowler – Trumpets

Recordings
The August 3 and 4, 2001 shows at the Rosemont Theatre were professionally filmed and then broadcast on Pay Per View during September 2002 and were followed by a DVD release on November 19, 2002.

Tour dates

References

2001 concert tours